Raises Academy (Angono, Rizal) Inc.  popularly known as Raises Academy is a private, non-sectarian school in Angono, Rizal Philippines. It is located at Brgy. San Pedro, for Preschool and Elementary, and Brgy. Kalayaan for High School. It was founded on February 21, 1997. From its initial nature as a tutorial center, it was transformed to a formal school providing accommodation to twenty-eight members of the faculty and catering to comparatively seven hundred fifty students. The new annex building was built to accommodate its growing family.

References

1997 establishments in the Philippines
Educational institutions established in 1997
Schools in Rizal
Private schools in the Philippines